The 2004–05 Euroleague was the fifth season of the professional basketball competition for elite clubs throughout Europe, organised by Euroleague Basketball Company, and it was the 48th season of the premier competition for European men's clubs overall. The 2004–05 season featured 24 competing teams, from 13 countries. The final of the competition was held in Olimpiisky Arena, Moscow, Russia, with the defending champions, Maccabi Tel Aviv, defeating Tau Cerámica by a score of 90-78.

Regular season
The first phase was a regular season, in which the competing teams were drawn into three groups, each containing eight teams. Each team played every other team in its group at home and away, resulting in 14 games for each team in the first stage. The top 5 teams in each group and the best sixth-placed team advanced to the next round. The complete list of tiebreakers was provided in the lead-in to the Regular Season results.

If one or more clubs were level on won-lost record, tiebreakers were applied in the following order:
Head-to-head record in matches between the tied clubs
Overall point difference in games between the tied clubs
Overall point difference in all group matches (first tiebreaker if tied clubs were not in the same group)
Points scored in all group matches
Sum of quotients of points scored and points allowed in each group match

Group C

Top 16
The surviving teams were divided into four groups of four teams each, and again a round robin system was adopted, resulting in 6 games each, with the two top teams advancing to the quarterfinals. Tiebreakers were identical to those used in the Regular Season.

The draw was held in accordance with Euroleague rules.

The teams were placed into four pools, as follows:

Level 1: The three group winners, plus the top-ranked second-place team
 CSKA Moscow, Climamio Bologna, Maccabi Elite Tel Aviv, Efes Pilsen
Level 2: The remaining second-place teams, plus the top two third-place teams
 FC Barcelona, Panathinaikos, Benetton Treviso, Cibona
Level 3: The remaining third-place team, plus the three fourth-place teams
 Žalgiris, Ülker, Real Madrid, AEK
Level 4: The fifth-place teams, plus the top ranked sixth-place team
 Tau Cerámica, Montepaschi Siena, Prokom Trefl Sopot, Scavolini Pesaro

Each Top 16 group included one team from each pool. The draw was conducted under the following restrictions:
No more than two teams from the same Regular Season group could be placed in the same Top 16 group.
No more than two teams from the same country could be placed in the same Top 16 group.
If there was a conflict between these two restrictions, (1) would receive priority.

Quarterfinals
Each quarterfinal was a best-of-three series between a first-place team in the Top 16 and a second-place team from a different group, with the first-place team receiving home advantage.

|}

Final four

Individual statistics

Rating

Points

Rebounds

Assists

Other Stats

Awards

Euroleague MVP
 Anthony Parker (  Maccabi Elite Tel Aviv )

Final Four MVP
 Šarūnas Jasikevičius (  Maccabi Elite Tel Aviv )

Finals Top Scorer
 Šarūnas Jasikevičius (  Maccabi Elite Tel Aviv )

All-Euroleague First Team 2004-05
 Šarūnas Jasikevičius (  Maccabi Elite Tel Aviv )
 Arvydas Macijauskas (  Tau Cerámica )
 Anthony Parker (  Maccabi Elite Tel Aviv )
 David Andersen (  CSKA Moscow )
 Nikola Vujčić (  Maccabi Elite Tel Aviv )

All-Euroleague Second Team 2004–05
 Jaka Lakovič (  Panathinaikos )
 Marcus Brown (  CSKA Moscow )
 Charles Smith (  Scavolini Pesaro )
 Luis Scola (  Tau Cerámica )
 Tanoka Beard (  Žalgiris )

Rising Star
 Erazem Lorbek (  Climamio Bologna )

Best Defender
 Dimitris Diamantidis (  Panathinaikos )

Alphonso Ford Top Scorer
 Charles Smith (  Scavolini Pesaro )

Alexander Gomelsky Coach of the Year
 Pini Gershon (  Maccabi Elite Tel Aviv )

Club Executive of the Year
 Jose Antonio Querejeta (  Tau Cerámica )

References and notes

Euroleague Competition Format

External links
Euroleague.net - Official Euroleague homepage.
Eurobasket.com - Popular basketball news site.
TalkBasket.net - Basketball forum.

 
EuroLeague seasons